Peperomia wibomii is a species of plant in the family Piperaceae. A member of the genus Peperomia, it is endemic to Ecuador, where it can be found in humid coastal forests (up to 500 meters in elevation).

References

Flora of Ecuador
wibomii
Endangered plants
Taxonomy articles created by Polbot